The women's long jump at the 1969 European Athletics Championships was held in Athens, Greece, at Georgios Karaiskakis Stadium on 19 September 1969.

Medalists

Results

Final
19 September

Participation
According to an unofficial count, 13 athletes from 10 countries participated in the event.

 (1)
 (1)
 (1)
 (1)
 (1)
 (1)
 (1)
 (1)
 (2)
 (3)

References

Long jump
Long jump at the European Athletics Championships
Euro